Gnaphosa is a genus of ground spiders that was first described by Pierre André Latreille in 1804. They all have a serrated keel on the retromargin of each chelicera.

Species
 it contains 148 species:

G. aborigena Tyschchenko, 1965 – Kazakhstan
G. akagiensis Hayashi, 1994 – Japan
G. alacris Simon, 1878 – France, Italy, Croatia, Morocco
G. alpica Simon, 1878 – France, Switzerland, Austria
G. altudona Chamberlin, 1922 – USA
G. antipola Chamberlin, 1933 – USA, Canada
G. artaensis Wunderlich, 2011 – Portugal, Spain (Balearic Is.)
G. atramentaria Simon, 1878 – France
G. azerbaidzhanica Tuneva & Esyunin, 2003 – Azerbaijan
G. badia (L. Koch, 1866) – Europe to Azerbaijan
G. balearicola Strand, 1942 – Spain (Balearic Is.)
G. banini Marusik & Koponen, 2001 – Russia (South Siberia), Mongolia
G. basilicata Simon, 1882 – Italy
G. belyaevi Ovtsharenko, Platnick & Song, 1992 – Mongolia
G. betpaki Ovtsharenko, Platnick & Song, 1992 – Russia (Urals), Kazakhstan
G. bicolor (Hahn, 1833) – Europe, Turkey, Caucasus, Russia (Europe to West Siberia)
G. bithynica Kulczyński, 1903 – Greece (Crete), Turkey, Lebanon, Israel, Jordan, Iran
G. borea Kulczyński, 1908 – Russia (Middle Siberia to Far East), North America
G. brumalis Thorell, 1875 – USA, Canada
G. californica Banks, 1904 – USA, Canada
G. campanulata Zhang & Song, 2001 – China
G. cantabrica Simon, 1914 – Spain, France
G. caucasica Ovtsharenko, Platnick & Song, 1992 – Russia (Caucasus)
G. chiapas Platnick & Shadab, 1975 – Mexico
G. chihuahua Platnick & Shadab, 1975 – Mexico
G. chola Ovtsharenko & Marusik, 1988 – Russia (Middle Siberia to Far East), Mongolia, China
G. clara (Keyserling, 1887) – North America
G. corticola Simon, 1914 – France
G. cumensis Ponomarev, 1981 – Ukraine, Russia (Europe), Kazakhstan, Mongolia
G. cyrenaica (Caporiacco, 1949) – Libya
G. danieli Miller & Buchar, 1972 – Afghanistan
G. dege Ovtsharenko, Platnick & Song, 1992 – Kyrgyzstan, Pakistan, India, China
G. dentata Platnick & Shadab, 1975 – USA
G. deserta Ponomarev & Dvadnenko, 2011 – Russia (Europe)
G. dolanskyi Řezáč, Růžička, Oger & Řezáčová, 2018 – South-eastern Europe, Ukraine, Russia (Europe), Turkey, Caucasus
G. dolosa Herman, 1879 – Southern to Eastern Europe, Turkey, Syria, Iraq, Iran, Caucasus, Russia (Europe) to Central Asia
G. donensis Ponomarev, 2015 – Russia (Europe)
G. eskovi Ovtsharenko, Platnick & Song, 1992 – Kazakhstan
G. esyunini Marusik, Fomichev & Omelko, 2014 – Mongolia
G. eucalyptus Ghafoor & Beg, 2002 – Pakistan
G. fagei Schenkel, 1963 – Kazakhstan, China
G. fallax Herman, 1879 – Hungary
G. fontinalis Keyserling, 1887 – USA, Mexico
G. funerea (Dalmas, 1921) – St. Helena
G. gracilior Kulczyński, 1901 – Russia (Middle and South Siberia to Far East), Mongolia, China
G. haarlovi Denis, 1958 – Central Asia
G. halophila Esyunin & Efimik, 1997 – Russia (Urals)
G. hastata Fox, 1937 – China, Korea
G. hirsutipes Banks, 1901 – USA, Mexico
G. iberica Simon, 1878 – Spain
G. ilika Ovtsharenko, Platnick & Song, 1992 – Kazakhstan, Kyrgyzstan, Uzbekistan
G. inconspecta Simon, 1878 – Western and Central Europe, Italy, Russia (Middle Siberia to Far East), Mongolia, China, Korea
G. jodhpurensis Tikader & Gajbe, 1977 – India, China
G. jucunda Thorell, 1875 – Ukraine, Russia (Europe, Caucasus)
G. kailana Tikader, 1966 – India
G. kamurai Ovtsharenko, Platnick & Song, 1992 – Korea, Japan
G. kankhalae Biswas & Roy, 2008 – India
G. kansuensis Schenkel, 1936 – Russia (Far East), China, Korea
G. ketmer Tuneva, 2004 – Kazakhstan
G. khovdensis Marusik, Fomichev & Omelko, 2014 – Mongolia
G. kompirensis Bösenberg & Strand, 1906 – Russia (Far East), China, Korea, Taiwan, Japan, Vietnam
G. koponeni Marusik & Omelko, 2014 – Russia (South Siberia)
G. kuldzha Ovtsharenko, Platnick & Song, 1992 – Turkmenistan, Kyrgyzstan
G. kurchak Ovtsharenko, Platnick & Song, 1992 – Kyrgyzstan
G. lapponum (L. Koch, 1866) – Europe, Russia (Europe to West Siberia)
Gnaphosa l. inermis Strand, 1899 – Norway
G. leporina (L. Koch, 1866) – Europe, Turkey, Caucasus, Russia (Europe to South Siberia), Central Asia, China
G. licenti Schenkel, 1953 – Russia (Europe to South Siberia), Kazakhstan, Kyrgyzstan, Mongolia, China, Korea
G. limbata Strand, 1900 – Norway
G. lonai Caporiacco, 1949 – Italy
G. lucifuga (Walckenaer, 1802) (type) – Europe, Turkey, Caucasus, Iran, Russia (Europe to South Siberia), Kazakhstan, China
Gnaphosa l. minor Nosek, 1905 – Turkey
G. lugubris (C. L. Koch, 1839) – Europe to Central Asia
G. mandschurica Schenkel, 1963 – Russia (Middle and South Siberia), Kazakhstan, Mongolia, China, Nepal
G. maritima Platnick & Shadab, 1975 – USA, Mexico
G. mcheidzeae Mikhailov, 1998 – Georgia
G. microps Holm, 1939 – North America, Europe, Turkey, Russia (Europe to Far East)
G. modestior Kulczyński, 1897 – Italy, Austria, Czechia to Romania
G. moerens O. Pickard-Cambridge, 1885 – China, Nepal
G. moesta Thorell, 1875 – Hungary, Romania, Ukraine, Russia (Europe)?
G. mongolica Simon, 1895 – Turkey, Hungary to China
G. montana (L. Koch, 1866) – Europe, Turkey, Russia (Europe to South Siberia), Kazakhstan
G. muscorum (L. Koch, 1866) – North America, Europe, Caucasus, Russia (Europe to Far East), Kazakhstan, China, Korea
Gnaphosa m. gaunitzi Tullgren, 1955 – Sweden, Russia (South Siberia)
G. namulinensis Hu, 2001 – China
G. nigerrima L. Koch, 1877 – Europe, Russia (Europe to Far East)
G. nordlandica Strand, 1900 – Norway
G. norvegica Strand, 1900 – Norway
G. occidentalis Simon, 1878 – Western Europe
G. oceanica Simon, 1878 – France
G. ogeri Lecigne, 2018 – France
G. oligerae Ovtsharenko & Platnick, 1998 – Russia (Far East)
G. opaca Herman, 1879 – Europe to Central Asia
G. orites Chamberlin, 1922 – North America, Northern Europe, Caucasus, Russia (Europe to Far East)
G. ovchinnikovi Ovtsharenko, Platnick & Song, 1992 – Kyrgyzstan
G. pakistanica Ovtchinnikov, Ahmad & Inayatullah, 2008 – Pakistan
G. parvula Banks, 1896 – USA, Canada
G. pauriensis Tikader & Gajbe, 1977 – India
G. pengi Zhang & Yin, 2001 – China
G. perplexa Denis, 1958 – Afghanistan
G. petrobia L. Koch, 1872 – Europe, Iran
G. pilosa Savelyeva, 1972 – Kazakhstan
G. poonaensis Tikader, 1973 – India
G. porrecta Strand, 1900 – Norway
G. potanini Simon, 1895 – Russia (South Siberia, Far East), Mongolia, China, Korea, Japan
G. potosi Platnick & Shadab, 1975 – Mexico
G. primorica Ovtsharenko, Platnick & Song, 1992 – Russia (Far East), Japan
G. prosperi Simon, 1878 – Spain
G. pseashcho Ovtsharenko, Platnick & Song, 1992 – Russia (Caucasus)
G. pseudoleporina Ovtsharenko, Platnick & Song, 1992 – Russia (South Siberia)
G. rasnitsyni Marusik, 1993 – Mongolia
G. reikhardi Ovtsharenko, Platnick & Song, 1992 – Kazakhstan, Kyrgyzstan
G. rhenana Müller & Schenkel, 1895 – France, Switzerland, Germany, Austria, Italy, Romania, Albania
G. rohtakensis Gajbe, 1992 – India
G. rufula (L. Koch, 1866) – Slovakia, Hungary, Ukraine, Russia (Europe), Kazakhstan
G. salsa Platnick & Shadab, 1975 – USA, Mexico
G. sandersi Gertsch & Davis, 1940 – Mexico
G. saurica Ovtsharenko, Platnick & Song, 1992 – Ukraine, Caucasus, Iran, Russia (Europe) to Central Asia
G. saxosa Platnick & Shadab, 1975 – USA
G. secreta Simon, 1878 – France
G. sericata (L. Koch, 1866) – USA to Guatemala, Cuba
G. serzonshteini Fomichev & Marusik, 2017 – Mongolia
G. similis Kulczyński, 1926 – Russia (Middle and South Siberia to Far East), China, Korea
G. sinensis Simon, 1880 – China, Korea
G. snohomish Platnick & Shadab, 1975 – USA, Canada
G. songi Zhang, 2001 – China
G. sonora Platnick & Shadab, 1975 – Mexico
G. steppica Ovtsharenko, Platnick & Song, 1992 – Turkey, Caucasus, Ukraine, Russia (Europe to South Siberia), Kazakhstan
G. sticta Kulczyński, 1908 – Scandinavia, Russia (Europe to Far East), Japan
G. stoliczkai O. Pickard-Cambridge, 1885 – Mongolia, China
G. stussineri Simon, 1885 – Greece
G. synthetica Chamberlin, 1924 – USA, Mexico
G. tarabaevi Ovtsharenko, Platnick & Song, 1992 – Kazakhstan, Kyrgyzstan
G. taurica Thorell, 1875 – Bulgaria to China
G. tenebrosa Fox, 1938 – probably Mexico
G. tetrica Simon, 1878 – France, Macedonia
G. tigrina Simon, 1878 – Mediterranean, Russia (Europe, South Siberia)
G. tumd Tang, Song & Zhang, 2001 – China
G. tunevae Marusik & Omelko, 2014 – Mongolia
G. tuvinica Marusik & Logunov, 1992 – Russia (West and South Siberia), Mongolia
G. ukrainica Ovtsharenko, Platnick & Song, 1992 – Ukraine, Russia (Europe to Central Asia), Iran, Turkmenistan
G. utahana Banks, 1904 – USA
G. wiehlei Schenkel, 1963 – Russia (South Siberia), Mongolia, China
G. xieae Zhang & Yin, 2001 – China
G. zeugitana Pavesi, 1880 – North Africa
G. zhaoi Ovtsharenko, Platnick & Song, 1992 – China
G. zonsteini Ovtsharenko, Platnick & Song, 1992 – Kyrgyzstan
G. zyuzini Ovtsharenko, Platnick & Song, 1992 – Kazakhstan

References

Further reading

Araneomorphae genera
Cosmopolitan spiders
Gnaphosidae
Taxa named by Pierre André Latreille